The following are the national records in speed skating in India maintained by the Ice Skating Association of India (ISAI).

Men

Women

References

External links
Ice Skating Association of India website

National records in speed skating
Records
Speed skating
Speed skating-related lists
Speed skating